The 2001 Irish Greyhound Derby took place during August and September with the final being held at Shelbourne Park in Dublin on 15 September 2001.

The winner Cool Performance won £100,000 and was trained by Sean Bourke, owned by Patsy Byrne & Mick Gleeson and bred by P J Keane. The race was sponsored by the Paddy Power.

Final result 
At Shelbourne, 15 September (over 550 yards):

Distances 
short-head, ½, head, head, 2¼ (lengths)

Competition Report
The leading Irish entry for the 2001 event was a greyhound called Late Late Show, owned by television and radio chat show host Pat Kenny. The greyhound had gained national fame and was running for charity. The Paul Hennessy trained black dog had won 17 of his last 19 races including a winning sequence of 16. he had won the Tote Gold Cup, Easter Cup and Euro Off-Track with earnings of £83,000 to date. Also expected to go well was Cool Performance, a greyhound that had broken his hock on two occasions since winning the Puppy Derby, he had been purchased by Patsy Byrne and had failed to make the 2001 English Greyhound Derby, for which he had been bought, due to his injuries. The English challenge was led by Sonic Flight and Droopys Vieri.

Rhincrew Tops went fastest in round one with a 29.82, Premier County recorded 29.84 and Sonic Flight 29.92 in other wins. A remarkable second round saw the track record broken twice; Droopys Vieri set a new Shelbourne record timed at 29.57 and just four races later Cool Performance equalled the new record. Sonic Flight was eliminated and the Late Late Show continued his customary late pace in races to get through to the next round.

Double Oaks champion Marinas Tina finished lame in quarter finals on a night when three of the heat winners recorded the same time of 29.83; they were Droopys Vieri, Cool Performance and Premier County.

Droopys Kewell won the first semi-final from the strong finishing Late Late Show and Cool Performance. A scrappy second semi-final race ended with success for Droopys Vieri from Dale Inferno and Tinys Bud. Premier County was eliminated after suffering from trouble but would ease to victory in the consolation final.

Tinys Bud took a slight lead when the final got underway, she was followed closely by Cool Performance and Droopys Kewell, but the latter was forced to check. Down the back straight the positions remained the same, with Droopys Vieri now making progress. Cool Performance gained a third bend lead with Droopys Vieri now very close behind but Late Late Show was now also gaining ground after encountering trouble early on. Cool Performance still led near the finishing line and held off the field and in particular the Late Late Show. They pair crossed the line in a photo finish with five runners just over a length apart. The photo finish gave Cool Performance the verdict from Late Late Show and the trophy was presented by Bertie Ahern.

Quarter finals

Semi finals

See also
2001 UK & Ireland Greyhound Racing Year

References

Greyhound Derby
Irish Greyhound Derby
Irish Greyhound Derby